T. nanus may refer to:
 Taoniscus nanus, the Dwarf Tinamou, a bird species
 Trimmatom nanus, a marine fish species
 Turnix nanus, the Black-rumped Buttonquail, a bird species
 Tylognathus nanus, a synonym for Hemigrammocapoeta nana, a ray-finned fish species  found in Israel, Jordan and Syria

See also
 Nanus (disambiguation)